The following elections occurred in the year 1852.

 1852 French legislative election
 1852 Newfoundland general election

Europe

United Kingdom
 List of MPs elected in the 1852 United Kingdom general election
 1852 United Kingdom general election

North America

Canada
 1852 Newfoundland general election

United States
 California's at-large congressional district
 1852 New York state election
 1852 and 1853 United States House of Representatives elections
 1852 United States presidential election
 1852 and 1853 United States Senate elections

See also
 :Category:1852 elections

1852
Elections